The Parable of the Rich Fool, also known as The Money Changer, is an oil painting on canvas of 1627 by Rembrandt, now in the Gemäldegalerie, Berlin. Produced early in the artist's career, it depicts the eponymous Biblical parable. The model for the figure is said to have been Rembrandt's father.

Related works

References

  Gary Schwartz, Rembrandt, zijn leven, zijn schilderijen, Atrium, Alphen a/d Rijn, 1984.

External links
 
 http://parablesreception.blogspot.nl/2014/01/rembrandt-and-parable-of-therich-fool.html
 http://parablesreception.blogspot.nl/2014/01/rembrandt-and-parable-of-therich-fool.html

1627 paintings
Paintings based on New Testament parables
Paintings by Rembrandt
Paintings in the Gemäldegalerie, Berlin